The Colle Fauniera is a mountain pass in the Cottian Alps, Piedmont, northern Italy, located at 2,480+ m elevation.

It is part of the communal territory of Castelmagno and Demonte.

It connects the Valle Grana, which ends here, with the Vallone dell'Arma (a lateral of the Valle Stura di Demonte). The name Colle dei Morti stems from a fierce fighting occurred in the nearby during the 17th century between Franco-Spanish and Piedmontese troops.

See also
 List of highest paved roads in Europe
 List of mountain passes

Landforms of Piedmont
Mountain passes of the Alps
Transport in Piedmont
Demonte